is a former Japanese football player.

Playing career
Mita was born in Tokyo on August 1, 1981. After graduating from high school, he joined newly was promoted to J1 League club, FC Tokyo in 2000. However he could not play at all in the match in 2 seasons. In 2002, he moved to J2 League club Albirex Niigata. Although he became a regular player as left side back until April, he lost regular position behind Katsuo Kanda from May and played many matches as substitute. In 2003, he became a regular player as left side back and right side back. The club also won the champions in 2003 and was promoted to J1 from 2004. However he lost regular position and his opportunity to play decreased in 2004. In 2005, he moved to J2 club Vegalta Sendai on loan. However he could hardly play in the match. In 2006, he returned to Albirex Niigata. He became a regular player as right side back again in 2006. However his opportunity to play decreased in 2007. In 2008, he moved to J2 club Shonan Bellmare. Although he played many matches as side back in early 2008, he could hardly play in the match from the middle of 2008. In 2009, he moved to J2 club Tokushima Vortis. He played many matches as regular right side back in 2009. However his opportunity to play decreased in 2010. In 2011, he moved to J2 club FC Gifu. He became a regular player as defensive midfielder in 2011. However his opportunity to play decreased in 2012 and he retired end of 2012 season.

Club statistics

References

External links

1981 births
Living people
Association football people from Tokyo
Japanese footballers
J1 League players
J2 League players
FC Tokyo players
Albirex Niigata players
Vegalta Sendai players
Shonan Bellmare players
Tokushima Vortis players
FC Gifu players
Asian Games medalists in football
Asian Games silver medalists for Japan
Footballers at the 2002 Asian Games
Association football defenders
Medalists at the 2002 Asian Games